General elections were held in the Dominican Republic on 16 May 1938. At the time, the country was a single-party state, with the Dominican Party as the only legally permitted party.

Jacinto Peynado of the Dominican Party was the only candidate in the presidential election and was elected unopposed, although his predecessor Rafael Trujillo maintained absolute control of the country. The Dominican Party won every seat in the Senate elections.

Results

References

Dominican Republic
1938 in the Dominican Republic
Elections in the Dominican Republic
One-party elections
Single-candidate elections
Presidential elections in the Dominican Republic
Election and referendum articles with incomplete results
May 1938 events